The Shannon family is an American family whose members are best known for their involvement in reality television. The family first appeared on TV in 2011, when June "Mama June" Shannon and her at-the-time five-year-old daughter, Alana "Honey Boo Boo" Thompson, appeared on the TLC series, Toddlers & Tiaras.

Family history
Alana's victories within the children's beauty pageant circuit coupled with her outgoing personality meant the two regularly appeared on the show and their success with audiences ultimately allowed them to have their own reality TV series, Here Comes Honey Boo Boo, which featured Alana's siblings, Anna, Jessica, and Lauryn, and other extended family members. Other programs featuring the family include Mama June: From Not to Hot, Dancing with the Stars: Juniors, Dr. Phil, and The Doctors.

The family has been the center of numerous controversies early on. One of their biggest scandals to date, the revelation that June had rekindled a relationship with a man who had molested one of her daughters, ultimately resulted in TLC cancelling Here Comes Honey Boo Boo, in the wake of the show's popularity and cost the family any chance at royalties earned from syndication. The family received another chance at their own series on We TV with Mama June: From Not to Hot, which chronicled June's weight loss following bariatric surgery. The show was later rebranded as Mama June: Family Crisis and Mama June: Road to Redemption after June’s arrest and drug addiction.

The Shannons

June Shannon
June Edith "Mama June" Shannon (born August 10, 1979) is the matriarch of the Shannon family, the mother of Anna, Jessica, Lauryn, and Alana. She was born in McIntyre, Georgia to Sandra Hundley and Marvin Shannon, who divorced when she was two. She has three siblings: Joanne "Doe Doe" Shannon, Joanie Shannon (now McDonald) and James Edward Shannon; and two half-sisters, Michelle Shannon and Nicole Shannon. Due to childhood cataracts that went untreated, June is legally blind. June became pregnant with her first daughter, Anna, at 14 and gave birth just days after her 15th birthday. She dropped out of school when she became pregnant, but she later earned her GED. June pursued relationships with men who would later become convicted sex offenders; her daughters Jessica and Lauryn were fathered by Michael Anthony Ford (b. 1977), who was found guilty of trying to exploit oral sex from a minor female online; and she briefly dated Mark McDaniel, who was convicted of abusing Anna and whom Lauryn believed to be her biological father for some time. Her youngest daughter, Alana, was born in 2005, fathered by Mike Thompson, from whom June split in 2014. Alongside Lauryn, June came out as bisexual in 2015. She stated she had been intimate with women but had never been in a relationship with one.

As an adult, June struggled with being morbidly obese, weighing 460 pounds at her heaviest. She subsequently underwent bariatric surgery, having part of her stomach removed as part of a sleeve gastrectomy, in 2016 and reportedly lost more than 300 pounds thanks to the surgery as well as the help of dieting and personal trainer, Kenya Crooks. In addition to her significant weight loss, she underwent cosmetic surgery, spending a reported $75,000 to further improve her appearance. 

June was in a relationship with Geno Doak. Doak has a criminal record, having served jail time for burglary, theft, and criminal damage to property. In March 2019, June and Doak were both arrested for felony drug possession in Alabama. The two later attended rehab before eventually splitting in 2021. June cited his abuse and relapse as reasons.

She later began dating Justin Stroud before the two married in March 2022.

Anna Cardwell
Anna Marie "Chickadee" Cardwell (née Shannon; born August 28, 1994) is the eldest of June's four children; her father is David Dunn. Because June was so young when Anna was born, having just turned 15 before she gave birth, she initially considered placing Anna for adoption by her aunt and uncle, Janice and James Shannon, but the paperwork was never finalized and Anna ultimately ended up being raised by her maternal grandmother, Sandra. While in June's custody, Anna was sexually abused by June's then-boyfriend, Mark McDaniel, who was later convicted for his crimes. Like her mother, Anna became pregnant as a teenager and gave birth to her first child, daughter Kaitlyn Elizabeth, in 2012. Kaitlyn has the surname Clark, after Anna's longtime boyfriend Caleb Clark, but Anna has never publicly named Kaitlyn's father; she has only said that they haven't spoken since Kaitlyn was two months old and that he was engaged with two children. She and Clark eventually broke up and Anna went onto marry Michael Cardwell (b. 1992). The two wed on May 25, 2014, and moved to Alabama, where their daughter Kylee Madison was born in 2015. Anna and Michael separated in 2017 and Anna returned to Georgia with her two children.

Anna has had a strained relationship with June, as June defended McDaniel in regards to accusations that he sexually assaulted her and reportedly began dating McDaniel again in 2014. Additionally, Anna alleged that June had stolen thousands out of her trust fund, leaving her with less than $18 in her savings account. During the time Anna involved lawyers in an effort to gain access to her accounts, which were managed by June, she took to social media in an effort to make money selling products that claimed to prevent Ebola, in the midst of the Ebola epidemic in the United States, which subjected her to backlash.

Jessica Shannon
Jessica Louise "Chubbs" Shannon (born October 12, 1996) is June's second daughter; her father is Michael Anthony Ford. When the family moved from McIntyre, Georgia to Hampton, Georgia, 17-year-old Jessica didn't accompany them, as she had less than three months until her high school graduation.

Lauryn Efird
Lauryn Mychelle "Pumpkin" Efird (née Shannon; born January 7, 2000) is June's 3rd daughter. Lauryn was raised believing her father was Mark McDaniel, a former partner of June's who sexually abused Anna, was never convicted for this but was convicted of molesting another child. June has admitted that she is not sure who Lauryn's biological father is. At the age of six, Lauryn was struck by lightning. Lauryn came out as bisexual alongside June in 2015. 

As a teenager, Lauryn began dating Joshua Efird. At 17, she welcomed daughter Ella Grace Efird with him.  In 2018, she stated that she wished she'd waited until she was older to have children and that it hadn't been her intention to become a teen mother. Lauryn and Josh married in April 2018 in Las Vegas, Nevada. They later welcomed son Bentley Jameson in June 2021 before quickly welcoming a pair of twins eleven months later in May 2022.

After June’s arrest in 2019, Lauryn took in Alana and obtained temporary custody. She was granted full custody in June 2022.

Alana Thompson
Alana Frances "Honey Boo Boo" Thompson (born August 28, 2005) is the fourth and youngest of June's daughters; her father is June's former longtime partner Mike "Sugar Bear" Thompson. Alana began to compete in beauty pageants at a young age, which earned her screen time on the popular TLC television show Toddlers & Tiaras that gave viewers a behind-the-scenes look at the world of pageantry. A popular member of the cast, she and her family were given their own show, Here Comes Honey Boo Boo, which was ultimately cancelled due to her mother's association with sex offender Mark McDaniel. Alana currently maintains an Instagram account and stars in  Mama June: From Not to Hot. In October 2018, it was confirmed that Alana would be a contestant on Dancing with the Stars: Juniors, paired with Tristan Ianiero and mentored by Artem Chigvintsev. It's been reported that Alana was paid $50,000 to appear on the show and would earn an additional $80,000 if she remained on the show for the entirety of the season and competed in the finale episode. She was eliminated in the fourth week. She later appeared with June in The Masked Singer. They were eliminated in the first round.

After June's March 2019 arrest, Alana now lives with half-sister Lauryn who has legal guardianship of Alana.

Kaitlyn Clark
Kaitlyn Elizabeth Clark (born July 26, 2012) is the eldest of Anna's two children, born to Anna when she was 17 years old. Her birth was featured on Season 1 of Here Comes Honey Boo Boo. Though Anna's high school sweetheart, Caleb Clark, whom Anna dated for two years, has said he believes himself to be Kaitlyn's father, Anna and her family expressed doubts as she had been intimately involved with a second man around the time she became pregnant. Neither Caleb nor the other man appear to publicly have a relationship with Kaitlyn and, after Anna wed Michael Cardwell, Kaitlyn reportedly began calling her stepfather "Daddy." Her half-sister, Kylee, was born when she was 3 years old. Notably, Kaitlyn was born with polydactyly, sporting a second thumb on her right hand; she later underwent surgery to remove her extra thumb, amidst Anna's concerns that her daughter would be bullied for her condition. After her mother and step-father separated in 2017, Kaitlyn moved with her mother and half-sister from Alabama, where she'd been living since the age of 2, to Georgia.

Kylee Cardwell
Kylee Madison Cardwell (born December 9, 2015) is the youngest of Anna's two children, born to Anna and her then-husband, Michael Cardwell, when Anna was 21 years old. Her middle name, Madison, honors her paternal grandmother.

Ella Grace Efird
Ella Grace Efird (born December 8, 2017) is Lauryn's eldest child; Lauryn was 17 when she welcomed her with now-husband Joshua Efird. Her family currently maintains an Instagram account for her, which had 92,600 followers as of May 2020. Her parents wed in 2018, when she was 4 months old.

Bentley Jameson Efird
Bentley Jameson Efird (born July 21, 2021) is the second addition to the Efird family.

Sylus and Stella Efird
Sylus Ray Efird and Stella Renae Efird are the twin children of Lauryn and Joshua as well as the third and fourth additions to the Efird family. Born just eleven months after brother Bentley.

Associates of the Shannons

Mike Thompson
Mike "Sugar Bear" Thompson is the ex-partner of June and father of Alana. He later married and divorced Jennifer Thompson (née Lamb). Mike later revealed he'd been unfaithful to June, having cheated on her with both men and women during the course of their relationship, on an episode of Marriage Boot Camp: Reality Stars. Jennifer expressed she had doubts as to whether Mike was the biological father of Alana and, without Mike's knowledge, submitted his DNA for a paternity test; the results were inconclusive, with the report saying the samples submitted had been corrupted. Mike told the press that after he and June separated, she'd been keeping Alana from seeing him.

Jennifer Lamb 
Jennifer Lamb is the ex-wife of Mike Thompson. She was previously married to Raymond Lamb, Jr., a former truck driver and convicted sex offender. She wed Lamb in 1994 and in 2014, he was convicted of sexually abusing a minor; he is currently serving a 35-year sentence at Wheeler Correctional Facility. It was reported that Jennifer was considering weight loss surgery, as her obesity was causing her mobility issues, but said that she was hesitant to undergo the surgery for fear her husband would leave her if she did, as Mike prefers larger women. She ultimately lost a substantial amount of weight and in 2019, Mike proposed to her a second time with a new diamond wedding ring. They later divorced.

Lee Thompson
Lee "Uncle Poodle" Thompson is Mike's brother, Alana's paternal uncle. He is openly gay and HIV-positive. He suffered from heart trouble in 2015, leading him to incur $150,000 in hospital bills.

Michael Ford
Michael Anthony Ford (born 1977) is the father of Jessica. He was convicted of sexual exploitation of a minor, after attempting to solicit oral sex from an undercover police officer he believed to be a teen girl. His arrest was featured on an episode of To Catch a Predator. Michael is currently incarcerated and ineligible for parole until 2026, after he was found to have violated his probation. He is currently at Graceville Correctional Facility.

Eugene "Geno" Doak
Eugene Edward "Geno" Doak (born October 8, 1975) is June's ex-boyfriend. The two began dating in 2017. Geno has a criminal history, including felony charges, for which he served time at Coastal State Prison. In 2009, he was admitted to a psychiatric facility following a suicide attempt. After being released from prison, Geno founded his own home improvement company, G&J Home Improvements, which is based in Griffin, Georgia. Additionally, he is divorced and has children of his own from previous relationships and the two previously dated for a brief time in 2015. He, along with June, was arrested in March 2019 for drug possession in Alabama. They later split in 2021, with June revealing she was victim to his abuse.

Mark McDaniel
Mark McDaniel is June's ex-partner and possibly the father of her third child, Lauryn. Mark pled guilty to aggravated child molestation in 2003, with June's eldest daughter, Anna, being his victim. June reportedly rekindled her relationship with Mark after his release from prison, resulting in the cancellation of Here Comes Honey Boo Boo, though June denied any wrongdoing.

TV appearances

Toddlers & Tiaras
The Shannons were first introduced to U.S. audiences through their appearances on TLC's Toddlers & Tiaras. June and Alana first appeared together in an episode titled Precious Moments Pageant 2011, which originally aired on January 4, 2012, though filming for the episode took place in 2011. The mother-daughter duo became regulars on the show, which gave viewers a behind-the-scenes look at the world of pageantry. Alana's outgoing personality and funny remarks made her a fan favorite and several of her phrases from the show, such as "A dollar makes me holler," later became the basis for popular internet memes. Audiences later expressed concern for Alana's health after it was revealed that June would give her daughter, then 6 years old, a mixture of soft drinks and energy drinks to give her enough energy to compete in pageants.

Here Comes Honey Boo Boo
Here Comes Honey Boo Boo premiered on TLC on August 8, 2012, which ran for four seasons, featuring the family and their daily lives. In the middle of filming the fifth season, TLC abruptly cancelled the show after it was confirmed June was dating a registered sex offender.

Dr. Phil
In December 2014, Anna appeared on an episode of Dr. Phil, alongside her grandmother, Sandra, to discuss the disappearance of money from her savings account, which June had access to, and the backlash she received as the result of endorsing products claiming to treat the Ebola virus and cancer.

The Doctors
In 2015, Alana and June appeared on an episode of The Doctors, who urged June to take control of Alana's weight, which had reached 125 pounds, making Alana clinically obese.

Mama June: From Not to Hot
Mama June: From Not to Hot premiered on We TV on February 24, 2017. A second season aired the following year.

Dancing with the Stars: Juniors
Alana appeared on Dancing with the Stars: Juniors, a spin-off of Dancing with the Stars that featured child stars and dancers. She was eliminated in the fourth week.

The Masked Singer
In 2021, Alana and June competed in season six of The Masked Singer as the wild card contestant "Beach Ball" which was the first contestant to have a double-sided head. Both faces were operated in the style of a puppet while its body was a vehicle with a hidden door on its body that they can enter and exit through. When eliminated and unmasked on week six where the character debuted, it was revealed that Alana operated the front face while June operated the back face. In addition, they had to put up with the heat inside and had to be careful not to accidentally drive "Beach Ball" off the stage. Due to her age at the time, Honey Boo Boo beat JoJo Siwa's record as the youngest contestant on the show.

Controversies

Go-go juice
During their time on Toddlers & Tiaras, June was filmed giving Alana, who was then 6 years old, a drink she referred to as "go-go juice." Later on, it was revealed that the go-go juice she had Alana consume before pageants was a mixture of Red Bull, an energy drink, and Mountain Dew, a carbonated beverage high in caffeine, sugar, and calories. Experts estimated that one serving of go-go juice contains as much caffeine as two cups of coffee, a worrisome amount considering that the American Academy of Pediatrics recommends children under the age of 12 not consume caffeine at all. June defended her decision to give the Red Bull-Mountain Dew mixture to Alana, saying that there were worse things she could give her daughter to drink, such as alcohol, and that she'd tried alternatives, notably Pixy Stix, which are referred to as "pageant crack" within the pageant community due to the energizing effects the high sugar content has on a child contestant's behavior.

June's relationship with a sex offender
At the height of the family's popularity and in the middle of filming what would be the last season of Here Comes Honey Boo Boo, June was rumored by tabloids to have rekindled her relationship with her ex-boyfriend, convicted sex offender Mark McDaniel. To make matters worse, Anna revealed to the media that Mark had sexually abused her and that after police began their investigation into Anna's claims, June didn't believe her. The scandal ultimately resulted in TLC canceling the show.

June's substance use
On March 13, 2019, June Shannon and her boyfriend, Geno Doak, were both arrested at a gas station in Alabama, after police were called to the scene following reports of a public dispute. Both June and Geno were arrested and charged with possession of a controlled substance, reportedly crack cocaine, and possession of drug paraphernalia, with a glass pipe found on June and a hypodermic needle found on Geno. Geno also faced an additional charge of domestic violence and harassment in relation to the public altercation with June. The two were indicted on felony charges related to drug possession and Doak with third-degree domestic violence on September 13, 2019, though later reports do not mention a needle being found in Geno's possession, only the pipe, which June reportedly told police belonged to her. The two failed to show for their indictment, but later, in October 2019, entered a plea of not guilty, and face the possibility of prison time, if convicted. June's family reportedly staged an intervention and were able to convince June to enter a drug rehabilitation program in North Carolina several days prior to her arrest in Alabama, though she stayed in the program just twelve hours before checking herself out. Since her arrest, her daughter Lauryn, also known as Pumpkin, has had custody of June's youngest daughter, Alana, also known as Honey Boo Boo, and June has had limited contact with both of them.

Family tree

Marvin Shannon, with Sandra Hundley
Joanne "Doe Doe" Shannon (b. December 30, 1964)
Amber Jackson
Son
Andrew Jackson
James Shannon (b. March 28, 1961) Married Janice Hughes (b. April 1, 1954)
Michael Shannon (b. June 6, 1976)
Kayla Shannon (b. December 12, 1997)
Jennifer Shannon (b. May 22, 1985) married Byron Jackson (b. March 9)
SirVaughn Jackson (b. August 26, 2006)
Lapone Jackson (b. September 6, 2007)
Cherish Jackson (b. December 4, 2008)
Allison Shannon (b. June 12, 1997)
Joanie Shannon, now McDonald (b. January 9, 1971)
Laci Anderson
June Shannon (b. August 10, 1979)
Anna Shannon (b. August 28, 1994), daughter of David Dunn
Kaitlyn Elizabeth Shannon (b. July 26, 2012), daughter of unnamed man
Kylee Madison Cardwell (b. December 9, 2015), daughter of Michael Cardwell
Jessica Shannon (b. October 12, 1996), daughter of Michael Ford
Lauryn Shannon (b. January 7, 2000), daughter of Michael Ford
Ella Efird (b. December 8, 2017), daughter of Joshua Efird
Bentley Efrid (b. July 21, 2021), son of Joshua Efird
Sylus Efrid (b. May 19, 2022), son of Joshua Efird
Stella Efrid (b. May 19, 2022), daughter of Joshua Efird
Alana Thompson (b. August 28, 2005), daughter of Mike Thompson
Half-sisters include:
Marvin Shannon with Renada
Michelle Shannon (b. March 26, 1984)
Anaya Shannon
Amiree Shannon
Jayce Shannon
Nichole Shannon (b. October 10)
Lynley Shannon

References

Families from Georgia (U.S. state)
People from Wilkinson County, Georgia
Participants in American reality television series